Glenwood High School is a public English medium high school for boys situated in the suburb of Glenwood in Durban in the KwaZulu-Natal province of South Africa. The school was established in 1910, as Durban Technical High School, and split with the Technical High School in 1928 to form Glenwood Boys High School.

History

Establishment
The school had its origins with the creation of a small institution called the Day Continuation School that was located in a double-story building on Smith St in August 1910 with a student roll of 24 boys.  In 1915, due to building size limitations, the Day Continuation School moved to the Technical College building and changed its name to Durban Technical High School which by 1916 had 150 students. Student numbers continued to grow during the First World War and by 1918 there were 267 scholars. In the same year the Natal Provincial Council appointed a commission to investigate the feasibility of expanding the school and the subsequent Coleman-Dukes Report stated that ..a large increase in the numbers [of students] for which it is exceedingly difficult to find accommodation... and recommended the allotment of 10 acres of land on the corner of Alan Paton and Bulwer Roads in Glenwood. The construction of the school buildings eventually took place and by 1934 the current premises were ready for occupation. At the same time, the school subject matter was changed and all technical subjects were removed from the curriculum (these subjects were allocated to Mansfield Road Intermediate School) and the name was changed from Durban Technical High School to Glenwood High School, also reflecting the new location.

War years

World War I
In 1915 South Africa sent one brigade of Infantry to support the Allied war effort on the Western Front.  The 1st South African Infantry Brigade comprised four battalions with the 2nd Battalion being known as the Natal & OFS Battalion, containing many men from Durban and Pietermaritzburg. In 1915, there were only 120 boys at the school, of which (from the Class of 1914 and earlier) twenty five ex-Glenwood pupils lost their lives as part of this Battalion during World War I Of those killed, four were killed during the Battle of Delville Wood.

World War II
In 1939, at the start of World War II there were 490 pupils in the school and during the six years of war, 457 Old Boys served in East Africa, the Western Desert and Italy.  Of these, 109 were in the South African or Royal Airforce. Out of the 457 who served, 120 old-boys lost their lives during this war.  There is a poignant picture of the school's 1st Rugby Team of 1935 where at least 15 of the 18 boys in the photograph volunteered for service in the war and six of those in the photograph were killed. These included Clement (Neville) McGarr, who was one of the prisoners of war to escape from Stalag Luft III as part of the "Great Escape".

1960s and Zoning
In the early 1960s the Natal Education Department (NED) made a controversial attempt to enforce school zoning in the core suburbs of Durban.  A study conducted by the NED showed that considerable amount of money was being paid to transport students to and from school and that children travelled "further than they should" and introduced a policy that compelled students to attend the closest school to their residence.  Glenwood old boys (supported by DHS old boys) defended the schools’ favouring of the children of old boys, reflecting an "English society siege-like mentality" to counter the Afrikaner policies after the National Party's election victory that threatened the perceived English school traditions.  Eventually a compromise was reached between the schools and the NED whereby a zoning system was implemented that allocated points based on children's place of residence and on whether they had ties to the school through either their siblings’ or father's schooling. It was labelled as ‘preferential admissions’ or ‘restrictive admissions’ and allowed the Glenwood management the freedom to take out-of-area students when they were not full.

Facilities
Glenwood High is one of the few Durban public schools with a boarding establishment. The boarding establishment was opened in 1935 and is known as Gibson House, named after Roy Gibson, the first pupil to be killed in World War 2. He was the son of "The Lady in White" who saw off soldiers at the docks embarking on ships for tours at the front during the Second World War.

Gibson House is situated on the corner of Alan Paton and Esther Roberts Roads, a short walk from the main school. The original boarding school took only a small number of boys (three dormitories) but has been expanded.

Notable alumni

Sport

Politics, law and government

Sports 
The sports that are offered in the school are:

 Athletics
 Basketball
 Chess
 Cricket
 Cross country
 eSports
 Golf
 Hockey
 Rugby
 Sailing
 Soccer
 Softball
 Squash
 Surfing
 Swimming
 Target shooting
 Water polo

Trevor Kershaw fraud scandal 
In 2019, Trevor Kershaw, who was headmaster between 1999 and 2015, pleaded guilty to charges of defrauding the school of over R5 million. After reaching a plea bargain with the State, he was sentenced to three years of correctional supervision, and a ten year prison sentence was suspended.

Notes

References

External links
 100 Best Schools in Africa
Glenwood High School official site
 Roll of Honour: World War I Roll of Honour: World War I | Glenwood High School
 Roll of Honour: World War II Roll of Honour: World War II | Glenwood High School

Schools in KwaZulu-Natal
Educational institutions established in 1910
Boys' schools in South Africa
1910 establishments in South Africa
High schools in South Africa